Rhamnogalacturonan exolyase (YesX) is an enzyme with systematic name α-L-rhamnopyranosyl-(1→4)-α-D-galactopyranosyluronate exolyase. This enzyme catalyses the following chemical reaction

 Exotype eliminative cleavage of α-L-rhamnopyranosyl-(1→4)-α-D-galactopyranosyluronic acid bonds of rhamnogalacturonan I oligosaccharides containing α-L-rhamnopyranose at the reducing end and 4-deoxy-4,5-unsaturated D-galactopyranosyluronic acid at the non-reducing end. The products are the disaccharide 2-O-(4-deoxy-β-L-threo-hex-4-enopyranuronosyl)-α-Lrhamnopyranose and the shortened rhamnogalacturonan oligosaccharide containing one 4-deoxy-4,5-unsaturated D-galactopyranosyluronic acid at the non-reducing end.

The enzyme is part of the degradation system for rhamnogalacturonan I in Bacillus subtilis strain 168.

References

External links 
 

EC 4.2.2